Arthur Griffiths (born 16 March 1879) was a professional footballer who played for Bristol Rovers and Notts County.

Playing as a full-back, Griffiths joined Bristol Rovers (then known as Bristol Eastville Rovers) in 1897 from Lozells. During his first two seasons Rovers played in both the Birmingham & District League and the professional section of the Western League, before becoming founder members of the Southern League in 1899. He went on to play 105 games for Rovers in the Southern League, scoring once, before joining Football League First Division side Notts County in January 1904.

Sources

1879 births
Footballers from Birmingham, West Midlands
English footballers
Association football fullbacks
Bristol Rovers F.C. players
Notts County F.C. players
English Football League players
1955 deaths